Gunn may refer to:

Places 
 Gunn City, Missouri, a village
 Gunn, Northern Territory, outer suburb of Darwin
 Gunn, Alberta, Canada, a hamlet
 Gunn Valley, a mountain valley in British Columbia, Canada
 Gun Lake (British Columbia), a Canadian lake formerly spelled Gunn Lake
 Gunn Lake, a lake in Minnesota
 Lake Gunn, New Zealand
 Gunn River, New Zealand
 Gunn Peaks, Palmer Land, Antarctica
 Mount Gunn, Victoria Land, Antarctica
 65P/Gunn, a periodic comet
 18243 Gunn, an asteroid

Other uses
 Gunn (film), 1967 film based on the 1958-1961 television series Peter Gunn
 Gunn (given name)
 Gunn (surname)
 Clan Gunn, Highland Scots clan of Norse origin
 Gunn High School, high school in Palo Alto, California
 Gunn diode, diode used in high-frequency electronics
 Gunns, Tasmanian company

See also
 Gunnr, one of the valkyries in Norse mythology
 Justice Gunn (disambiguation)